Sir Edward Hastings (1541–1603) was an English politician. He was a Member (MP) of the Parliament of England for Tregony in 1571, and Leicestershire in 1597–98. He was knighted by Thomas Radclyffe, 3rd Earl of Sussex, in 1570.

Family
He was the fourth son of the Francis Hastings, 2nd Earl of Huntingdon and purchased the estate of Leicester Abbey from his brother, Henry Hastings, 3rd Earl of Huntingdon. He was married to Barbara Devereux (second daughter of Sir William Devereux and Jane Scudamore); they had four sons and one daughter.

References

1541 births
1603 deaths
English MPs 1571
English MPs 1597–1598
Members of the pre-1707 English Parliament for constituencies in Cornwall
Members of the Parliament of England for Leicestershire
Younger sons of earls